The members of the 6th Manitoba Legislature were elected in the Manitoba general election held in December 1886. The legislature sat from April 14, 1887, to June 16, 1888.

Premier John Norquay formed a majority government. A falling out with Canadian prime minister John A. Macdonald over railway development led to a financial shortfall in the Manitoba government accounts and the fall of the Norquay government in December 1887. David Howard Harrison served as premier for less than a month and then the Liberals led by Thomas Greenway took power.

Thomas Greenway served as Leader of the Opposition until 1888, when John Norquay became opposition leader.

David Glass served as speaker for the assembly.

There were two sessions of the 6th Legislature:

James Cox Aikins was Lieutenant Governor of Manitoba.

Members of the Assembly 
The following members were elected to the assembly in 1886:

Notes:

By-elections 
By-elections were held to replace members for various reasons:

Notes:

References 

Terms of the Manitoba Legislature
1887 establishments in Manitoba
1888 disestablishments in Manitoba